Una Vivienne Cassie Cooper  (née Dellow; 29 September 1926 – 5 July 2021) was a New Zealand planktologist and botanist.

Early life 
Cassie Cooper was born on 29 September 1926 in the Auckland suburb of Epsom to Annie Eveline Bell and her husband, Kenneth Dellow. She was educated at Takapuna Grammar School, where her father was headmaster from 1935. She received her Bachelor of Arts and Master of Arts degrees from Auckland University College, and her PhD from Victoria University College.

Career 
In 1957, she made the first regional study of phytoplankton in New Zealand. Later in life, she focused more on aquatic botany, and was appointed a research scientist on freshwater algae in the Botany Division of the Department of Scientific and Industrial Research (DSIR). In her career, she wrote over fifty papers and several books, including Marine Phytoplankton in New Zealand Waters and Checklists of the Freshwater Diatoms of New Zealand. Cooper also published Micro Algae – Microscopic Marvels which she writes to appeal to a more popular readership.

Cassie Cooper garnered several awards and titles for her accomplishments, including an honorary research associateship by the Botany Department at University of Auckland and the Botany Division of DSIR, and an honorary life membership of the New Zealand Limnological Society and the New Zealand Marine Science Society. In the 1997 Queen's Birthday Honours, she was appointed a Member of the New Zealand Order of Merit, for services to marine biology. She was described as New Zealand's "leading expert" on diatoms.

Cassie Cooper was a founding member of the Australasian Society for Phycology and Aquatic Botany, the International Society of Diatomists, and the Asian Pacific Phycological Association. She retired in 1986.

In 2017, Cassie Cooper was selected as one of the Royal Society Te Apārangi's "150 women in 150 words", celebrating the contributions of women to knowledge in New Zealand.

Personal life
In 1953, she married Richard Morrison Cassie, a fellow professor at the University of Auckland. They had two children. He died in 1974. She married Robert Cecil Cooper, a botanist, in 1984. Cooper would also predecease her.

Death
Cassie Cooper died on 5 July 2021.

References

1926 births
2021 deaths
20th-century New Zealand women scientists
20th-century New Zealand botanists
Planktologists
Women planktologists
University of Auckland alumni
Victoria University of Wellington alumni
New Zealand women botanists
Members of the New Zealand Order of Merit
People educated at Takapuna Grammar School
People associated with Department of Scientific and Industrial Research (New Zealand)